Winik is a surname. Notable people with the surname include:

Jay Winik (born 1957), American historian
Marion Winik, American journalist and author
Tyler Winik, community consultant and advisor on the Florida political process 
Howard Winik, community leader in the United Kingdom and magistrate